The Carnegie Science Center is one of the four Carnegie Museums of Pittsburgh, Pennsylvania. It is located in the Chateau neighborhood. It is located across the street from Acrisure Stadium.

Overview
The Carnegie Science Center is the most visited museum in Pittsburgh, and is located along the Ohio River on the North Shore. It has four floors of interactive exhibits totaling over 400 exhibits, and attracts over 700,000 visitors each year. Among its attractions are the Buhl Planetarium (which features the latest in digital projection technology), the Rangos Giant Theater (promoted as "the biggest screen in Pittsburgh"), SportsWorks, the Miniature Railroad & Village, the USS Requin (a World War II submarine) and Roboworld, touted as "the world's largest permanent robotics exhibition." The Roboworld exhibition contains more than 30 interactive displays featuring "all things robotic", and is also the first physical home for Carnegie Mellon University’s Robot Hall of Fame.

Updates
According to Nicholas Efran, "The Carnegie Science Center has been a gathering place for kids and families for many years." However, currently there are many new exhibits that staff are "Not able to include because of the smaller size of the building" In June 2018, the museum's new wing opened, allowing the museum to host new and larger exhibits.

In August 2021, the Pittsburgh Zoning Board of Adjustment extended the Center's use of its 450-space parking lot until 2026, at which point it will need to significantly reduce the space number to 75 spaces to conform to zoning regulations.

In October 2021, the Center received funding from the Centers for Disease Control and Prevention (CDC)'s Communities for Immunity initiative because of its support of vaccine confidence in the Pittsburgh community. It used the $10,000 award to contribute to its COVID-19 vaccination awareness programs. 

As of February 2022 due to having low infection levels in the area they lifted their mask mandate and now face masks are optional.

History
Its predecessor was the Buhl Planetarium and Institute of Popular Science, which opened on October 24, 1939. The Buhl Planetarium was the fifth major planetarium in the United States, and was popular for several decades.  However, by the 1980s it had begun to show signs of age. An expansion was ruled out, so the institute was relocated to the Chateau neighborhood. However, it became apparent to the Buhl Institute that the relocation efforts would require more staffing than they were able to provide. At this point, the Carnegie Institute (under the leadership of Robert Wilburn) stepped in, showing interest in merging with the Buhl Institute. Both parties agreed to the merger in 1987. On October 5, 1989, construction began on the $40 million building, designed by local architect Tasso Katselas, which was renamed the Carnegie Science Center as a result of the merger. The Henry Buhl Jr. Planetarium and Observatory was reinvented in this new facility. The Center opened in October 1991.

Roboworld

The Roboworld area is the second-floor attraction at the Carnegie Science Center. It is touted as "the world's largest permanent robotics exhibition", with more than 30 interactive displays featuring "all things robotic".

The first robot encounter in Roboworld is Andy Roid, the Robothespian, an interactive, animatronic robot that introduces visitors to the concepts of robotic sensing, processing and acting. The area's other exhibits showcase different types of robots and videos about them. 

Roboworld is also home to famous robots such as R2D2, Hal9000, C-3PO, and Gort.

The Robot Hall of Fame features famous robots from science fiction films, television, and video games, such as R2-D2, C-3PO, Data, the T-800 Terminator, R.O.B., Maschinenmensch, Gort, Robby the Robot, Robot B-9, HAL 9000, and Huey, Dewey, and Louie from Silent Running.

Highmark SportsWorks
Highmark SportsWorks (formerly UPMC SportsWorks) is one of the major, permanent exhibits of the Carnegie Science Center.  It is one of larger science and sports exhibitions in the world, with over 30 interactive experiences in which visitors can participate. The main idea of SportsWorks is "to inspire learning and curiosity by uniting the experience of sports for every age level with the laws of science that controls sports." SportsWorks features three themed areas:  Physics of Sports (exploring the science of balance, trajectory, center of gravity, momentum, etc.), LifeWorks (featuring information for keeping a healthy lifestyle), and Sports Challenge (demonstrating various physical activities present in many sports).

The previous sponsor, UPMC, ended its sponsorship of SportsWorks in 2006. On November 13, 2008, the Carnegie Science Center unveiled plans for a new  SportsWorks, sponsored by Highmark.  It reopened in the Fall of 2009.

From October 8, 2007, until May 2008, SportsWorks housed the controversial exhibit BODIES... The Exhibition.  At least one employee of the Carnegie Science Center left her job due to the implementation of this exhibit.

A committee from Pittsburgh Regional Transit, then known as Port Authority, recommended in 2007 that the site be purchased and that SportsWorks be demolished to allow for construction of tracks for the North Shore Connector, an extension of Pittsburgh's light rail line to the North Side of Pittsburgh.

E-motion cone
The E-motion cone is a white-colored, inverted cone which sits atop the Science Center building. It is referred to as the Weather Cone and was designed by New York architect Shashi Caan and lighting designer Matthew Tanteri. It was installed in 2000 with a computerized lighting system. In 2008 a storm damaged the cone, thus it underwent upgrades to its lighting system with an addition of energy-efficient bulbs. At night, it is lit with different colors, signalling the weather forecast from WTAE-TV for the coming day.

See also

 Miniature Railroad & Village
 Carnegie Museums of Pittsburgh
 List of museums in Pennsylvania
 Seddon Bennington - director of the museum from 1994 until 2002.

External links

References

Museums in Pittsburgh
Museums established in 1991
Science museums in Pennsylvania
Institutions accredited by the American Alliance of Museums
Science centers
Association of Science-Technology Centers member institutions
1991 establishments in Pennsylvania